Chloe Morgan (born 12 December 1989) is an English lawyer, journalist and former footballer who last played as a goalkeeper for FA Women's Championship club Crystal Palace.

Morgan is from Leytonstone in the London Borough of Waltham Forest. As a youngster the film Erin Brockovich inspired her to become a personal injury lawyer. She also enjoyed football and played recreationally for local clubs including Leyton Orient alongside her studies.

Morgan progressed to playing for Tottenham Hotspur in the FA Women's Premier League Southern Division. During the 2013–14 season, local rivals Arsenal required a goalkeeper for their reserve team and signed Morgan from Spurs. With Arsenal she won the 2014 FA WSL Development Cup and made 16 reserve team appearances in 2014–15.

In 2019 Morgan was among 11 of Spurs' existing players to be offered a full-time professional contract to remain with the club following their promotion to the FA Women's Super League. She had started 18 of 20 league games in the 2018–19 FA Women's Championship campaign, in which Spurs finished as runners-up to Manchester United.

Morgan combined her football career with a full-time job as a personal injury lawyer. Upon retiring at the end of the 2021–22 FA Women's Championship Morgan announced her retirement from football. Morgan is a co-presenter on the woman's football podcast Upfront alongside Rachel O'Sullivan, co-founder of the Girls On The Ball platform.

Personal life
Morgan is openly LGBT.

References

External links

1989 births
Women's association football goalkeepers
Tottenham Hotspur F.C. Women players
Women's Super League players
English women's footballers
FA Women's National League players
Living people
Footballers from the London Borough of Waltham Forest
Arsenal W.F.C. players
English lawyers
People from Leytonstone
LGBT association football players
English LGBT sportspeople
21st-century LGBT people